The Protestant church of Burgum or Cross Church or Saint Martin's church is a religious building in Burgum, Netherlands,  one of the  medieval churches in Friesland.

The tuffstone edifice was built c. 1100 and was enlarged about a century later. It was again enlarged about a century after that and possesses a monumental Pipe organ that was built from 1783 to 1788 by L. van Dam & Zn. from Leeuwarden.

The church is located on the Nieuwstad 5 and was once a Roman Catholic church dedicated to Saint Martin but became a Protestant church after the protestant reformation. 
It is listed as a Rijksmonument, number 35634 and is rated with a very high historical value.

References

Tytsjerksteradiel
Burgum
Rijksmonuments in Friesland
Romanesque architecture in the Netherlands
Protestant churches in the Netherlands